The West Wing of the White House houses the offices of the president of the United States.  The West Wing contains the Oval Office, the Cabinet Room, the Situation Room, and the Roosevelt Room.

The West Wing's four  floors contain offices for the vice president, White House chief of staff, the counselor to the president, the senior advisor to the president, the White House press secretary, and their support staffs. Adjoining the press secretary's office, in the colonnade between the West Wing and the Executive Residence, is the James S. Brady Press Briefing Room, along with workspace for the White House press corps.

History

Before the construction of the West Wing, presidential staff worked on the western end of the second floor of what is now the Executive Residence. However, when Theodore Roosevelt became president, he found that the existing offices in the mansion were insufficient to accommodate his family of six children as well as his staff.

A year later, in 1902, First Lady Edith Roosevelt hired McKim, Mead & White to separate the living quarters from the offices, to enlarge and modernize the public rooms, to re-do the landscaping, and to redecorate the interior.  Congress approved over half a million dollars for the renovation.

The West Wing was originally intended as a temporary office structure, built on the site of the extensive greenhouses and stables. The President's Office and the Cabinet Room took up the eastern third of the building closest to the Residence and attached colonnaded terrace. Roosevelt's rectangular office with adjacent Cabinet Room through a set of double doors which was located approximately where the Roosevelt Room is now near the centre.

In 1909, William Howard Taft expanded the building southward, covering the tennis court. He placed the first Oval Office at the centre of the addition's south facade, reminiscent of the oval rooms on the three floors of the White House. Later, at the outset of his presidency, Herbert Hoover rebuilt the West Wing, excavating a partial basement, and supporting it with structural steel. The completed building, however, lasted less than seven months. On December 24, 1929, the West Wing was significantly damaged by an electrical fire. This four-alarm fire was the most destructive to strike the White House since the Burning of Washington 115 years earlier. One hundred and thirty firefighters, over nineteen engine companies, and four truck companies were needed to extinguish the blaze. Caused either by a faulty or blocked chimney flue or defective wiring, the fire began in the attic of the building where an estimated 200,000 government pamphlets were stored. These papers quickly ignited. Many of the important documents in the area were recently moved to the Library of Congress following a minor remodel of the building. The fire was noticed at approximately 8:00 pm by White House messenger Charlie Williamson, and immediate action was taken to save items in the building. Hoover had the West Wing rebuilt, and added air-conditioning.

The fourth and final major reorganization was undertaken less than three years later by Franklin D. Roosevelt. Dissatisfied with the size and layout of President Hoover's West Wing, he engaged New York architect Eric Gugler to redesign it in 1933. To create additional space without increasing the apparent size of the building, Gugler excavated a full basement, added a set of subterranean offices under the adjacent lawn, and built an unobtrusive "penthouse" story. The directive to wring the most office space out of the existing building was responsible for its narrow corridors and cramped staff offices. Gugler's most notable change was the addition to the east side containing a new Cabinet Room, Secretary's Office, and Oval Office. The new office's location gave presidents greater privacy, allowing them to slip back and forth between the Executive Residence and the West Wing without being in full view of the staff.

As the size of the president's staff grew over the latter half of the 20th century, the West Wing generally came to be seen as too small for its modern governmental functions. Today, most of the staff members of the Executive Office of the President are located in the adjacent Eisenhower Executive Office Building.

First floor

Oval Office

Cabinet Room

Roosevelt Room

Richard Nixon also renamed the room, previously called by Franklin Roosevelt the "Fish Room" (where he kept aquariums, and where John F. Kennedy displayed trophy fish), in honour of the two presidents Roosevelt: Theodore, who first built the West Wing, and Franklin, who built the current Oval Office. By tradition, a portrait of Franklin D. Roosevelt hangs over the mantel of the Roosevelt Room during the administration of a president from the Democratic Party and a portrait of Theodore Roosevelt hangs during the administration of a Republican president (although Bill Clinton chose to retain the portrait of Theodore Roosevelt above the mantel). In the past, the portrait not hanging over the mantel hung on the opposite wall. However, during the first term of George W. Bush, an audio-visual cabinet was placed on the opposite wall providing secure audio and visual conference capabilities across the hall from the Oval Office.

Press Briefing Room

During the 1930s, the March of Dimes constructed a swimming pool so that Franklin Roosevelt could exercise, as therapy for his polio-related disability. Richard Nixon had the swimming pool covered over to create the Press Briefing Room, where the White House Press Secretary gives daily briefings.

White House press corps

The journalists, correspondents, and others who are part of the White House press corps have offices near the press briefing room.

Ground floor

Situation Room

White House Mess
The West Wing ground floor is also the site of a small restaurant operated by the Presidential Food Service and staffed by Naval culinary specialists and called the White House Mess. It is located underneath the Oval Office, and was established by President Truman on June 11, 1951.

Second floor

Depiction on The West Wing TV series

In 1999, The West Wing television series brought greater public attention to the workings of the presidential staff, as well as to the location of those working in the West Wing. The show followed the working lives of a fictional Democratic U.S. president, Josiah Bartlet, and his senior staff. When asked whether the show accurately captured the working environment in 2003, Press Secretary Scott McClellan commented that the show portrayed more foot traffic and larger rooms than in the real West Wing.

References

External links

 White House Museum: West Wing, with floorplan and historical images
 West Wing Interactive, from National Journal Magazine

White House
McKim, Mead & White buildings